Ngio Ngam may refer to several places in Thailand:

Ngio Ngam, Mueang Phitsanulok
Ngio Ngam, Uttaradit